White Collar is a crime/mystery television series that premiered on October 23, 2009, on the USA Network.  The series stars Matt Bomer as Neal Caffrey, a former conman, forger and thief, and Tim DeKay as FBI Special Agent Peter Burke. The pair form an unlikely partnership as they work together to apprehend white collar criminals.  The series also stars Willie Garson as Mozzie, an old friend of Neal's who occasionally aids the FBI in their investigations; Tiffani Thiessen as Elizabeth Burke, Peter's wife; and Marsha Thomason and Sharif Atkins as agents Diana Berrigan and Clinton Jones, respectively.  Natalie Morales appeared in the first season as agent Lauren Cruz. Hilarie Burton was introduced in the second season as Sara Ellis, a love interest for Neal. She joined the main cast at the beginning of the third season.

White Collar aired its first season of 14 episodes in two parts, which premiered in 2009 and 2010. This was followed by a second season, comprising 16 episodes. The first group of nine episodes aired in summer 2010, while the remaining seven aired in spring 2011.  The third season began airing in 2011 and ended in 2012. The first 10 episodes of the season aired in summer 2011, while the remaining six began airing in winter 2012. The series was renewed for a fourth season comprising 16 episodes, which began airing in July 2012. A fifth season which was renewed for 16 episodes, later reduced to 13, started airing in October 2013. In March 2014, the series was renewed for a sixth season, which was confirmed to be its final season the following September. The season premiered on November 6, 2014. On December 18, after the airing of the last episode of the sixth season, White Collar ended its run. The first three seasons are available on DVD in regions 1, 2, and 4, while the first season is also available on Blu-ray. In Australia, Region 4, Season 4 was released on 2 July 2014, Season 5 on 10 December 2014, Season 6 and The Complete Series on the 6 May 2015.

Series overview

Episode list

Season 1 (2009–10)

Season 2 (2010–11) 
White Collar was renewed for a second season scheduled to begin July 13, 2010 on USA Network, with Marsha Thomason joining the cast as a series regular and Hilarie Burton appearing in a six-episode arc as insurance investigator Sara Ellis. The nine-episode summer season ran through September 7, 2010 and concluded with a seven-episode winter season that began on January 18, 2011.

Season 3 (2011–12) 
On September 27, 2010, White Collar was renewed for a 16 episode third season, which began June 7, 2011. Hilarie Burton joined the cast as a series regular.  Diahann Carroll appeared as June, and Denise Vasi, who appeared in the pilot episode as June's granddaughter Cindy, returned as well. The first half of the season also saw guest appearances by Dana Ashbrook, Beau Bridges, Eliza Dushku, Nathen Garson, Lena Headey, Ernie Hudson, Olek Krupa, Al Sapienza, and the return of Matthew Keller (Ross McCall).  Series star Tim DeKay directed one episode.  Series creator and executive producer Jeff Eastin tweeted that Andrew McCarthy, who played Vincent Adler, would also direct an episode.  Another flashback episode, "The Dentist of Detroit", revealed much of Mozzie's childhood.  The first half of the season, consisting of 10 episodes, concluded on August 9, 2011, while the remaining six episodes began airing on January 17, 2012.

Season 4 (2012–13) 
White Collar was renewed for a fourth season of sixteen episodes on August 25, 2011.  Treat Williams appeared throughout the season as Sam, an undercover agent from Washington whose past overlaps with Neal's.  Mekhi Phifer appeared in the first two episodes as Kyle Collins, a manhunter working for the federal government.  Gregg Henry recurred as a man who helps Neal and Mozzie hide while in the Cape Verde Islands, while Mia Maestro appeared as Maya, a woman with whom Neal becomes involved while on the run.  Laura Vandervoort appeared in one episode as a wealthy socialite who becomes another love interest for Neal.  Michael Weston appeared in one episode as a criminal mastermind, alongside Laurie Williams.  Rebecca Mader appeared in one episode as Abigail, a woman who forces Neal to take part in a heist.  Perrey Reeves appeared in one episode as a dedicated fixer.  Gloria Votsis returned as Alex Hunter in the eighth episode of the season.  Victor Webster made an appearance in the ninth episode of the season as Eric Dunham, a trader on Wall Street who is being investigated for insider trading.  Titus Welliver guest starred as Senator Terrence Pratt, a man who may be linked to Neal's father.  Reed Diamond made an appearance as Cole Edwards, a construction mogul with links to the government.  Sprague Grayden appeared as a younger Ellen Parker, while Judith Ivey continued playing the older version of the character. Hilarie Burton reprised her role as insurance investigator and Neal's love interest Sara Ellis; she appeared in four episodes altogether. The remaining six episodes of season four began airing in January 2013.

Season 5 (2013–14)
On September 25, 2012, USA Network renewed the series for a 16-episode fifth season, but this was later reduced to 13. It premiered on October 17, 2013. Marsha Thomason was pregnant during the filming of season five and did not appear for the majority of the season.

Season 6 (2014)

Home video releases

References

External links
 
 
 

Lists of American crime drama television series episodes
White Collar (TV series) episodes
2009 American television seasons
2010 American television seasons
2011 American television seasons
2012 American television seasons
2013 American television seasons
2014 American television seasons